Cryin' Holy Unto the Lord is a 1991 album and the last studio album by Bill Monroe & the Blue Grass Boys, released by MCA Records, now Universal Music Group. This album was produced by President of Opry Entertainment, Steve Buchanan.

Critical reception

Michael McCall of AllMusic writes, "An all-gospel album propped up with some stellar guests, it includes Ricky Skaggs, Ralph Stanley, the Osborne Brothers, Jim & Jesse McReynolds, and Mac Wiseman."

Stewart Evans writes in his review, "Ultimately, this album is not one of Monroe's all-time greats, but it's quite a nice work, all the more impressive considering the length of Monroe's career."

Track listing

Musicians

Bill Monroe – Mandolin (All Tracks), Tenor Vocal (Track 1 through 8, 10), Lead Vocal (Track 9)
Tom Ewing – Acoustic Guitar (All tracks except 6), Lead Vocal (Track 1, 3, 5, 7), Baritone Vocal (Track 6)
Clarence "Tater" Tate – Fiddle (Track 1 through 8, 10), Bass Vocal (Track 1 through 7, 9, 10), Banjo (Track 8), Baritone Vocal (Track 8)
Blake Williams – Banjo (Track 1 through 5, 7, 8, 10), Baritone Vocal (Track 1, 3, 5, 7)
Ralph Stanley – Lead Vocal (Track 2)
Ricky Skaggs – Acoustic Guitar (Track 2, 6), Baritone Vocal (Track 2), Lead Vocal (Track 6)
Billy Rose – Acoustic Bass (Track 2 Through 10)
Jim Campbell – Fiddle (Track 2, 7, 10)
Bobby Osborne – Mandolin, Lead Vocal (Track 4)
Sonny Osborne – Banjo, Baritone Vocal (Track 4)
Mac Wiseman – Acoustic Guitar, Lead Vocal (Track 8)
Jim McReynolds – Lead Vocal (Track 10)
Jesse McReynolds – Mandolin, Baritone Vocal (Track 10)

Production

Produced by Steve Buchanan
Recorded and Mixed by David Parrish
Recording Assistance: Gene Wooten
Recorded at Reflections Studio, Sound Emporium, and Digital Recorders
Mixed at Masterlink Studio, Reflections Studio
Mastered by Glenn Meadows at Masterfonics, Nashville, Tennessee
Art Direction: Simon Levy
Photography: Jim DeVault

Track information and credits verified from the album's liner notes. Album credits can also be found at Discogs and AllMusic

References

External links
Universal Records Official Site

1991 albums
MCA Records albums
Bill Monroe albums